Joaquin Garay III (born October 30, 1968) is an American actor best known for playing the role of Paco in Herbie Goes Bananas.  He later moved on to writing, acting and producing sketch comedy at the Improv at the Groundlings and the L.A. Connection in Los Angeles. His father was Joaquin Garay.

External links

1968 births
Living people
American male child actors